Beatriz Vaz e Silva (born 7 October 1985), commonly known as Bia or Bia Vaz, is a Brazilian soccer coach and former player. As a "volante", she played for Brazilian clubs including Santos, Ferroviára, São José and Flamengo. She represented the Boston Breakers of the National Women's Soccer League (NWSL) and played for the Brazil national team.

She was waived by the Boston Breakers in October 2015.

Coaching career
In 2017, while still playing for Audax, Bia Vaz was invited onto Vadão's national team coaching staff. She retained her position as an assistant coach when Pia Sundhage took over as Brazil's head coach in 2019.

Honours 
Ferroviária
 Campeonato Brasileiro de Futebol Feminino: 2014
 Copa do Brasil de Futebol Feminino: 2014
 Campeonato Paulista de Futebol Feminino: 2013

Foz Cataratas
 Copa do Brasil de Futebol Feminino: 2011

Flamengo 
Campeonato Brasileiro de Futebol Feminino: 2016

References

External links
 
 Boston Breakers player profile

1985 births
Living people
Brazilian women's footballers
National Women's Soccer League players
Boston Breakers players
Expatriate women's soccer players in the United States
Women's association football midfielders
Associação Ferroviária de Esportes (women) players
Santos FC (women) players
Southern Nazarene University alumni
Southern Nazarene Crimson Storm women's soccer players
Brazilian expatriate sportspeople in the United States
Sport Club Corinthians Paulista (women) players
São José Esporte Clube (women) players